James Meehan may refer to:

 James Meehan (surveyor) (1774–1826), Irish-Australian explorer and surveyor
 James Meehan (lumberman) (1834–1920), American lumberman and member of the Wisconsin State Assembly
 James Leo Meehan (1891–1943), American film director and screenwriter
 Jim Meehan (James Michael Meehan, 1952–2018), American professional poker player

See also
 Jim Meehan (footballer) (1935–1988), Australian rules footballer